Battle Riot V is an upcoming professional wrestling supercard event produced by Major League Wrestling (MLW) that will take place on April 8, 2023, at the 2300 Arena in Philadelphia, Pennsylvania. It will the fifth event under the Battle Riot chronology.

Production

Background
Battle Riot is a recurring event that was established by MLW in 2018. The event is named after the Battle Riot match, a multi-competitor match type in which wrestlers are eliminated until one is left and declared winner. The match begins with a number of participants in the ring, who are then eliminated by either pin, submission, or going over the top rope and having both feet touch the venue floor. The declared winner of the Battle Riot match receives a future title shot for the MLW World Heavyweight Championship. On February 8, 2023, it was announced that Battle Riot V would take place on June 23, 2022, at the 2300 Arena in Philadelphia.

Storylines
The show will feature several professional wrestling matches that resulted from scripted storylines, where wrestlers portrayed villains, heroes, or less distinguishable characters in the scripted events that built tension and culminated in a wrestling match or series of matches.

The main feature of the event is the titular Battle Riot match, a 40-man rumble rules-based match where the winner will receive a "golden ticket", which they can redeem for an MLW World Heavyweight Championship match anytime and anywhere.

Matches

List of Battle Riot participants

Notes

References

External links

Battle Riot
2023 in professional wrestling
April 2023 events in the United States
Professional wrestling in Philadelphia
2023 American television episodes
2020s American television specials
Events in Philadelphia